Peglio is a comune (municipality) in the Province of Como in the Italian region Lombardy, located about  north of Milan and about  northeast of Como.

Peglio borders the following municipalities: Domaso, Dosso del Liro, Gravedona, Livo.

Demographic evolution

References

Cities and towns in Lombardy